Ilias Fifa (born 16 May 1989) is a Moroccan-born long-distance runner competing internationally for Spain. He gained Spanish citizenship in July 2015 after entering Spain nine years earlier by hiding under a truck crossing the border.

Career
He won the 2016 European Championship 5000 metres, in one of the closest long distance finishes ever.  

He participated in the 5000 metres at the 2015 World Championships in Beijing but with a time of 13:28.29 he did not reach the final. He qualified for the 5000 m event at the 2016 Summer Olympics, where he finished in a non-qualifying 9th place in his heat.

International competitions

Personal bests
Outdoor
3000 metres – 7:49.13 (Barcelona 2014)
5000 metres – 13:05.61 (Rome 2015)

References

External links

1989 births
Living people
Spanish male long-distance runners
People from Tangier
World Athletics Championships athletes for Spain
Spanish sportspeople of Moroccan descent
Athletes (track and field) at the 2016 Summer Olympics
Olympic athletes of Spain
European Athletics Championships medalists